Benigno V. Aldana National High School (BVANHS), formerly Pozorrubio Junior High School, Pozorrubio High School, and Benigno V. Aldana National Memorial High School,  is a public high school located and serves Pozorrubio, Pangasinan, Philippines and nearby towns with about 2,500 students each year and  111 teachers in its faculty.

History 
BVANHS was established on July 15, 1946 and initially having 235 students. Its first classrooms were located in several sites at the heart of the town. Locations of the first classrooms were at Don Andres Olarte's residence at Sison Street, Don Gerardo Nabor Sr.'s residence at Espiritu Street, old Itliong-Estaris residence at Rizal Street (now property of a bank), Jovellanos-Venezualla ancestral house (oldest structure standing in Pozorrubio at 131 years as of 2013), Andres Aldana Sr.'s house (now abandoned) at Espiritu Street, and Orestes Olarte abode at Caballero Street. The very first school principal was Enrique Telesforo  from Lingayen. The first class graduated in 1947 with 37 graduates and their graduation ceremony was held at the Plaza Pergola at the heart of the town.

Right after that, the school was moved to its permanent location in Barangay Cablong, Pozorrubio, Pangasinan with three hectares of land donated by Don and Doña Orestes and Cion Olarte. Later on, 3.7 more hectares of land was purchased using money raised from fund-raising and contributions initiated by the Parents-Teachers Association established by the school.

Class '49 was the first one to have a secondary section that divided the graduation class into two sections of 56 and 26 students.

Enrique was then replaced by Candelario Quinto in 1948 as principal of the school followed by Mr. Numerio Mac. Vinluan in 1952, and then later succeeded by Brigida Q. Magno in 1967 until Martial Law was declared in 1972. Orlando Perez then served as principal from 1975 to November 2001, followed by  Alfredo Calugay who served as principal for almost three years when he was reassigned to another school in 2004 due to issues regarding his professional career in the school. Agnes Raguinan was then appointed as OIC (Officer-In-Charge) by the Division II, Region I, Office of the  Department of Education of the Philippines in 2004 to 2006. Dr. Roberto B. Quezon now seats as the current principal of the school after being appointed as OIC in 2006 and promoted to the position in 2008.

The Campus
Many changes took place physically in the school in its early years such as the cogon-wildgrass rooftops and sawali walls which was then gradually replaced with newer and more durable materials such as cement and steel. Presently, the school is considered as one of the best in the Philippines with regards to availability of resources and educational facilities. The campus now boasts 17 modern buildings, 10 relaxation areas and study sheds, a Library and Media Center, a Computer Building, a mini Theater, an audio-visual room, a Student's Worship Center (notably a first in public high schools in the area). Also several individual Department Centers, four canteens (including one main cafeteria), two sheltered stage areas, one basketball court, one badminton court, one volleyball court, a fishpond and agricultural area, a botanical park, and a large open space quadrangle. The school also boasts its green environment with almost every area covered and shaded with trees and garbage cans spread everywhere to keep the environment clean.

Furthermore, the campus hosts a local museum of artifacts for the town, and other historical legacies donated to the school.

Most of the improvements of the campus are donated by alumni and parents of students of the school. Further expansion and developments are still performed to accommodate the increasing student population size.

References

External links

 Official website of Benigno V. Aldana National High School -- Alumni List, History, Photos, and more 

High schools in Pangasinan
1946 establishments in the Philippines
Educational institutions established in 1946